Hafiz Rasheed Ahmed who served as a member of the Senate of Pakistan from March 2006 to March 2012.

He is the son of Ghulam Mohammad Sadiq, former member of the National Assembly of Pakistan.

References

Members of the Senate of Pakistan
Year of birth missing (living people)
Jamiat Ulema-e-Islam (F) politicians
People from Charsadda District, Pakistan
Pakistani Islamic religious leaders
Pakistani Sunni Muslims